Nyandoro is a surname. Notable people with the surname include:

Esrom Nyandoro (born 1980), Zimbabwean footballer
George Nyandoro (1926–1994), Zimbabwean politician and activist
Gibson Nyandoro (1954 or 1955–2008), Zimbabwean war veteran and political dissident
Henry Nyandoro (1969–1998), Kenyan footballer
Rudolf Nyandoro (born 1968), Zimbabwean Roman Catholic prelate